Karamabad may refer to:
Karamabad, Golestan, a village in Minudasht County, Golestan Province, Iran
Karamabad, Mirbag-e Shomali, a village in Mirbag-e Shomali Rural District, Central District, Delfan County, Lorestan Province, Iran
Karamabad, Nurabad, a village in Nurabad Rural District, Central District, Delfan County, Lorestan Province, Iran
Karamabad, Doab, a village in Doab Rural District, Central District, Selseleh County, Lorestan Province, Iran
Karamabad, Qaleh-ye Mozaffari, a village in Qaleh-ye Mozaffari Rural District, Central District, Selseleh County, Lorestan Province, Iran
Karamabad, Yusefvand, a village in Yusefvand Rural District, Central District, Selseleh County, Lorestan Province, Iran
Karamabad, West Azerbaijan, a village in Gejlarat-e Gharbi Rural District, Aras District, Poldasht County, West Azerbaijan Province, Iran

See also
Karimabad (disambiguation)